Caversham Park Village is a suburb of Reading, England.

It is entirely residential and associated with Emmer Green, which has the closest amenities — much of it is marked as Emmer Green.  Both are upland areas of the former enlarged form of Caversham, now suburbs of Reading. Whilst the area has no formal boundaries, it generally refers to the residential area constructed on part of the former grounds of Caversham Park, to the eastern side of Caversham and adjoining the border with Oxfordshire.

The village was largely developed between the mid 1960s and early 1970s, with the construction of 1500 new houses and the supporting road infrastructure. Unlike most of the rest of Caversham, which became part of Reading in 1911, Caversham Park Village remained in Oxfordshire until 1977, when the boundaries were redrawn to include it in Reading and it was transferred to Berkshire.

Caversham Park Village is shared with Emmer Green in forming the 'Peppard' electoral ward of the borough of Reading named after Rotherfield Peppard, also known as Peppard which is the village adjoining the north of the rest of Emmer Green.

Performing Arts

Caversham is home to community drama group Caversham Park Theatre, also known as The Milestone Players

References

Suburbs of Reading, Berkshire